This is a list of Malaysian football transfers for the 2011 transfer window. Moves featuring Malaysia Super League, Malaysia Premier League and Malaysia FAM Cup club are listed.

The first transfer window began once clubs had concluded their final domestic fixture of the 2010 season. The transfer window closed on 15 December 2010.

2011 First Transfers 
All clubs without a flag are Malaysian. Otherwise it will be stated.

Transfers

Loans 
Players were loaned for Malaysia Cup matches only.

Unattached Players

Notes

References

2011
Tranfers
Malaysia